Harpiniopsis is a genus of crustaceans in the family Phoxocephalidae. Species of this genus are found throughout the world. It was first described by Knud Stephensen in 1925.

Species 
WoRMS lists the following species:

 Harpiniopsis aciculum Ren in Ren & Huang, 1991
 Harpiniopsis amundseni (Gurjanova, 1946)
 Harpiniopsis australis (J.L. Barnard, 1961)
 Harpiniopsis bandelei Ledoyer, 1986

 Harpiniopsis capensis (J.L. Barnard, 1962)
 Harpiniopsis emeryi J.L. Barnard, 1960
 Harpiniopsis epistomata J.L. Barnard, 1960
 Harpiniopsis fulgens J.L. Barnard, 1960
 Harpiniopsis galera J.L. Barnard, 1960
 Harpiniopsis gurjanovae (Bulyčeva, 1936)
 Harpiniopsis hayashisanae Hirayama, 1992
 Harpiniopsis kobjakovae (Bulyčeva, 1936)
 Harpiniopsis miharaensis (Nagata, 1960)
 Harpiniopsis moiseevi (Gurjanova, 1953)
 Harpiniopsis nadania (J.L. Barnard, 1961)
 Harpiniopsis naiadis J.L. Barnard, 1960
 Harpiniopsis orientalis (Bulyčeva, 1936)
 Harpiniopsis pacifica (Bulyčeva, 1936)
 Harpiniopsis percellaris J.L. Barnard, 1971
 Harpiniopsis petulans J.L. Barnard, 1966
 Harpiniopsis profundis J.L. Barnard, 1960
 Harpiniopsis pseudonadania Ledoyer, 1986
 Harpiniopsis salebrosa (Gurjanova, 1936)
 Harpiniopsis schurini (Bulyčeva, 1936)
 Harpiniopsis similis Stephensen, 1925
 Harpiniopsis spaercki (Dahl, 1959)
 Harpiniopsis tarasovi (Bulyčeva, 1936)
 Harpiniopsis triplex J.L. Barnard, 1971
 Harpiniopsis vadiculus Hirayama, 1987
 Harpiniopsis wandichia (J.L. Barnard, 1962)

References

Gammaridea
Taxa described in 1925